Sofía Julia Rito Enocksson (born ) is an Uruguayan weightlifter, competing in the 53 kg category and representing Uruguay at international competitions. 

She competed at world championships, including at the 2015 World Weightlifting Championships, and at the 2016 Summer Olympics.

Early life
Rito was born in Stockholm, Sweden to Julio Rito, who is an Uruguayan. Her mother Lotta Enocksson is a plastic artist and is the origin of one of Sofía Rito's surnames, Enocksson. Julio Rito had been exiled from Uruguay during the military dictatorship. Sofía Rito was raised in Stockholm and later in Strängnäs, Sweden.

Major results

References

External links

1985 births
Living people
Uruguayan people of Swedish descent
Swedish people of Uruguayan descent
Uruguayan female weightlifters
Sportspeople from Stockholm
Olympic weightlifters of Uruguay
Weightlifters at the 2016 Summer Olympics
Weightlifters at the 2019 Pan American Games
Pan American Games competitors for Uruguay